Wang Na may refer to:

Front Palace, the viceroy office in Siam, whose holder was second only to the king
Front Palace, Bangkok, the physical palace occupied by the above

Sportspeople
Wang Na (synchronised swimmer) (born 1984), Chinese synchronised swimmer
Wang Na (volleyball) (born 1990), Chinese volleyball player
Wang Na (field hockey) (born 1994), Chinese field hockey player
Wang Na (racewalker) (born 1995), Chinese racewalking athlete